Phaloe cruenta is a moth of the subfamily Arctiinae first described by Jacob Hübner in 1823. It is found in South America, including Brazil, Argentina, Paraguay, Bolivia and Uruguay.

The larvae have been recorded feeding on Eupatorium inulaefolium, Artemisa absynthium, Heliothropium tiaridoides and Tournefortia brachiata.

References

Moths described in 1823
Arctiinae